A list of lists of characters in fictional works, broken down by medium and sorted alphabetically by the name of the fictional work.

Lists of book characters 

 List of recurring Albert Campion characters
 List of Alex Rider characters
 List of minor characters in the Alice series
 List of Amelia Peabody characters
 List of Angels & Demons characters
 List of minor Animorphs characters
 List of Anita Blake: Vampire Hunter characters
 The Vampire Council of Anita Blake: Vampire Hunter
 List of Atlas Shrugged characters
 List of Avalon: Web of Magic characters
 List of Axis of Time characters
 List of Bernice Summerfield characters
 List of Boogiepop characters
 List of The Canterbury Tales characters
 List of Catch-22 characters
 List of Gemma Doyle Trilogy characters
 List of War and Peace characters
 List of CHERUB characters
 List of The Chronicles of Narnia characters
 List of The Clique series characters
 List of Cthulhu Mythos characters
 List of The Da Vinci Code characters
 List of The Dark Tower characters
 List of Darkness viewpoint characters
 List of Deltora Quest characters
 List of The Deptford Mice characters
 List of Dexter characters
 List of Diary of a Wimpy Kid characters
 Discworld characters
 List of Doctor Dolittle characters
 Characters in Dragonriders of Pern
 Drones Club
 List of Dune characters
 List of The Dying Earth characters
 List of characters in Earthsea
 List of Emberverse characters
 List of Ender's Game characters
 List of Fablehaven characters
 List of Fudge series characters
 List of The Godfather series characters
 List of Hank the Cowdog characters
 List of Harry Potter characters
 List of Henderson's Boys characters
 List of minor The Hitchhiker's Guide to the Galaxy characters
 List of His Dark Materials and The Book of Dust characters
 List of Honorverse characters
 List of The Hunger Games characters
 List of Imran Series characters
 List of Inheritance Cycle characters
 List of Inspector Rebus characters
 List of Jeeves characters
 List of The Keys to the Kingdom characters
 List of La Comédie humaine characters
 List of Les Misérables characters
 Lists of The Walking Dead characters
 List of The Walking Dead (comics) characters
 List of The Walking Dead (TV series) characters
 List of The Walking Dead (video game series) characters
 List of Demonbane characters
 List of The Passage (2010 novel) characters
 List of Middle-earth characters
 List of Middlesex characters
 List of Midnight's Children characters
 List of The Mistmantle Chronicles characters
 List of Moby-Dick characters
 List of The Mortal Instruments characters
 List of minor Mulliner characters
 List of The Neverending Story characters
 List of The Night Angel Trilogy characters
 List of One Thousand and One Nights characters
 List of Tom Clancy's Op-Center characters
 List of Otherworld characters
 List of Oz characters
 List of minor Palliser characters
 List of The Penderwicks characters
 List of Peter Pan characters
 List of The Power of Five characters
 List of characters in the Jean le Flambeur series
 List of Ring characters
 List of Robot series characters
 List of The Saga of Darren Shan characters
 List of Septimus Heap characters
 List of The Seventh Tower characters
 List of The Shapeshifter characters
 List of Sharpe series characters
 List of characters in Shiloh
 List of The Southern Vampire Mysteries characters
 List of Starship Troopers characters
 List of Swallows and Amazons characters
 List of Tom Swift characters
 List of The Tale of Genji characters
 List of Temeraire characters
 List of To Kill a Mockingbird characters
 List of Tom Sawyer characters
 List of Twilight characters
 List of minor Ukridge characters
 List of Ulysses characters
 List of The Underland Chronicles characters
 List of supporting A Series of Unfortunate Events characters
 List of Watership Down characters
 List of Wheel of Time characters
 List of Where the Red Fern Grows characters
 List of Wicked characters
 List of Wild Cards characters
 List of minor The Will of the Empress characters
 List of Xanth characters
 List of Ying Xiong Wu Lei characters

Back to top

By author

 List of Dickensian characters
 List of Robert A. Heinlein characters
 List of Peter Simple's characters
 List of P. G. Wodehouse characters
 List of characters in mythology novels by Rick Riordan

Back to top

Lists of film characters

Lists of animated film characters

 List of Balto characters
 List of Cars characters
 List of Disney's Aladdin characters
 List of Disney's Beauty and the Beast characters
 List of Disney's Cinderella characters
 List of Disney's Fantasia characters
 List of Disney's Hercules characters
 List of Disney's Mulan characters
 List of Disney's Sleeping Beauty characters
 List of Hotel Transylvania characters
 List of Ice Age characters
 List of Khan Kluay characters
 List of Kung Fu Panda characters
 List of Lilo & Stitch characters
 List of Looney Tunes and Merrie Melodies characters
 List of Madagascar (franchise) characters
 List of Monsters vs. Aliens characters
 List of Monsters, Inc. characters
 List of Osmosis Jones and Ozzy & Drix characters
 List of Peter Pan characters
 List of Shrek characters
 List of The Emperor's New Groove characters
 List of The Incredibles characters
 List of The Jungle Book characters
 List of The Land Before Time characters
 List of The Lego Movie characters
 List of The Lion King characters
 List of The Little Mermaid characters
 List of The Nightmare Before Christmas characters
 Thomas the Tank Engine film characters

Back to top

Lists of live-action film characters

 AFI's 100 Years...100 Heroes & Villains
 Characters and races of The Dark Crystal
 List of 28 Days Later characters
 List of A Nightmare on Elm Street characters
 List of Alfred Hitchcock cameo appearances
 List of Alien characters
 List of American Pie characters
 List of Austin Powers characters
 List of Baahubali characters
 List of Back to the Future characters
 List of Blade Runner characters
 List of Buffy the Vampire Slayer characters
 List of minor Buffy the Vampire Slayer characters
 List of Buffyverse villains and supernatural beings
 List of Clueless characters
 List of Divergent characters
 List of Evil Dead characters
 List of Final Destination characters
 List of Friday the 13th characters
 List of From Dusk till Dawn characters
 List of Gran Torino characters
 List of Halloween (film series) characters
 List of Harry Potter characters
 List of Hatchet characters
 List of Hellraiser characters
 List of Highlander characters
 James Bond
 List of James Bond allies
 List of Bond girls
 List of recurring characters in the James Bond film series
 List of James Bond villains
 List of Jurassic Park characters
 List of Kingsman characters
 List of Let the Right One In characters
 List of Lorien Legacies characters
 List of M*A*S*H characters
 List of My Big Fat Greek Wedding characters
 List of Ocean's characters
 List of Osmosis Jones and Ozzy & Drix characters
 List of Peter Pan characters
 List of Planet of the Apes characters
 List of Predator characters
 List of Puppet Master characters
 List of Rambo characters
 List of Resident Evil film characters
 List of Ring characters
 List of Rob Zombie characters
 List of Rocky characters
 List of Saw characters
 List of Scarface characters
 List of Scream (film series) characters
 List of Sin City characters
 List of The Expendables characters
 List of The Grudge characters
 List of The Hunger Games characters
 List of The Jungle Book characters
 List of The Karate Kid characters
 List of The Librarian characters
 List of The Mummy characters
 List of The Phantom (film) characters
 List of The Pink Panther characters
 List of The Producers characters
 List of The Stand characters
 List of The Strangerhood characters
 List of Twilight characters
 List of Where the Red Fern Grows characters
 List of characters played by multiple actors in the same film
 List of fictional cats in film
 List of fictional primates in film
 List of films with LGBT characters
 List of The Godfather series characters
 List of minor characters in The Matrix series
 List of original characters in The Hobbit film series
 List of original characters in The Lord of the Rings film series

Back to top

Lists of franchise characters

 The Wiggles characters
 List of Highlander characters
 List of Ice Age characters
 List of Indiana Jones characters
 List of Looney Tunes and Merrie Melodies characters
 List of characters in Madagascar (franchise)
 List of Mario franchise characters
 List of Muppets
 List of Peter Pan characters
 List of Pokémon characters
 List of Pokémon
 List of Resident Evil characters
 List of Scooby-Doo characters
 List of Sesame Street characters
 List of Shrek characters
 List of Star Wars characters
 List of Teenage Mutant Ninja Turtles characters
 List of Yogi Bear characters

Back to top

Lists of game characters

Lists of roleplaying game characters

 List of Dark Sun characters
 List of Dragonlance characters
 List of Forgotten Realms characters
 List of Greyhawk characters
 List of Ravenloft characters

Back to top

Lists of video game characters

 List of Ace Attorney characters
 List of characters in Chrono Trigger
 List of Darkstalkers characters
 List of Donkey Kong characters
 List of The King of Fighters characters
 List of Mortal Kombat characters
 List of Soulcalibur characters
 List of Street Fighter characters
 List of Tekken characters
 List of Touhou Project characters
 List of Virtua Fighter characters
 List of Xenosaga characters

Back to top

Lists of play characters

 List of Shakespearean characters (A–K)
 List of Shakespearean characters (L–Z)

Back to top

Lists of sequential art characters

Lists of anime and manga characters

 List of Assassination Classroom characters
 List of Bleach characters
 List of Boogiepop characters
 List of Cardcaptor Sakura characters
 List of D.N.Angel characters
 List of Dr. Stone characters
 List of Dragon Ball characters
 List of Fighting Spirit characters
 List of FLCL characters
 List of Fruits Basket characters
 List of Fullmetal Alchemist characters
 List of Gravitation characters
 List of Great Teacher Onizuka characters
 List of InuYasha characters
 List of Kodocha characters
 List of MÄR characters
 List of Mobile Suit Gundam characters
 List of Mobile Suit Gundam SEED characters
 List of Naruto characters
 List of Negima! Magister Negi Magi characters
 List of Neon Genesis Evangelion characters
 List of One Piece characters
 List of Ouran High School Host Club characters
 List of Puella Magi Madoka Magica characters
 List of Rurouni Kenshin characters
 List of Sailor Moon characters
 List of Shaman King characters
 List of Witch Hunter characters
 List of xxxHolic characters
 List of Zatch Bell! characters

Back to top

Lists of comic book characters

 List of Amalgam Comics characters
 List of The Amory Wars characters
 List of Asterix characters
 List of Big Bang Comics characters
 List of Blueberry characters
 List of The Boys characters
 List of Elfquest characters
 List of Empowered characters
 List of Iron Man enemies
 List of Johnny the Homicidal Maniac characters
 List of Scott Pilgrim characters
 List of Sin City characters
 List of Sonic the Comic characters
 List of Sonic the Hedgehog comic book characters
 List of Strangehaven characters
 List of characters in Transformers comics
 List of Warrior Nun Areala characters
 List of X-Men members

Back to top

Lists of comic strip characters

 Secondary characters in Calvin and Hobbes
 List of Dick Tracy characters
 List of Doonesbury characters
 List of For Better or For Worse characters
 List of Garfield series characters
 List of Motley's Crew characters
 List of Peanuts characters
 List of Pearls Before Swine characters
 List of Pugad Baboy villains

Back to top

Lists of webcomics characters

 List of 8-Bit Theater characters
 List of Homestuck characters
 List of Kevin and Kell characters
 List of Megatokyo characters
 Characters of The Order of the Stick
 Characters of Sluggy Freelance

Back to top

Lists of television series characters

Lists of live-action television series characters

 List of 24 characters
 List of 30 Rock characters
 List of 7th Heaven characters
 List of 90210 characters
 List of Absolutely Fabulous characters
 The Addams Family Characters
 List of Alias characters
 List of All Saints characters
 List of 'Allo 'Allo! Characters
 List of Alphas characters
 List of American Horror Story characters
 List of Angel characters
 List of minor Angel characters
 List of Arrested Development characters
 List of Being Human characters
 List of Being Human (North American TV series) characters
 List of Beverly Hills, 90210 characters
 List of The Big Bang Theory characters
 List of The Bill characters
 List of The Bill characters (A–D)
 List of The Bill characters (E–L)
 List of The Bill characters (M-P)
 List of The Bill characters (Q–Z)
 List of Blackadder characters
 List of Black Books characters
 List of Buffy the Vampire Slayer characters
 List of minor Buffy the Vampire Slayer characters
 List of Buffyverse villains and supernatural beings
 List of Charmed characters
 List of Chuck characters
 List of Desperate Housewives characters
 Doctor Who
 List of Doctors
 List of Doctor Who Companions
 List of Doctor Who creatures and aliens
 List of Doctor Who villains
 List of Eureka characters
 List of Fringe characters
 List of Gilmore Girls characters
 List of Glee characters
 List of Heroes characters
 List of Hollyoaks characters (2008)
 List of House characters
 List of How I Met Your Mother characters
 List of Jericho characters
 List of La Luna Sangre characters
 List of Lie To Me Characters
 List of Merlin characters
 The Mentalist Characters
 List of Monk characters
 Mork & Mindy Characters
 Power Rangers
List of Power Rangers Dino Charge characters
List of Power Rangers Dino Thunder characters
List of evil Power Rangers
List of Power Rangers Jungle Fury characters
List of Power Rangers Lightspeed Rescue characters
List of Power Rangers Lost Galaxy characters
List of Power Rangers Lightspeed Rescue characters
List of Power Rangers Megaforce characters
Mighty Morphin Power Rangers Characters
Villains in Mighty Morphin Power Rangers
List of Power Rangers Ninja Storm characters
List of Power Rangers Operation Overdrive characters
List of Power Rangers S.P.D. characters
List of Power Rangers Samurai characters
Power Rangers in Space Characters
Villains in Power Rangers in Space
List of Power Rangers Time Force characters
Power Rangers Turbo Characters
Villains in Power Rangers Turbo
List of Power Rangers Wild Force characters
 List of Primeval characters
 List of Prison Break minor characters
 List of Pushing Daisies characters
 List of The Sandman characters
 List of characters on Scrubs
 List of Shameless characters
 List of Sherlock characters
 List of Skins characters
 List of Smallville characters
 List of The Sopranos characters
 Star Trek
 Star Trek: The Original Series Characters
 Star Trek: The Next Generation Characters
 Star Trek: Deep Space Nine Characters
 Star Trek: Voyager Characters
 Star Trek: Enterprise
 Main Characters
 List of minor recurring characters in Star Trek: Enterprise
Super Sentai
Himitsu Sentai Gorenger Characters
J.A.K.Q. Dengekitai Characters
Battle Fever J Characters
Denshi Sentai Denziman Characters 
Taiyo Sentai Sun Vulcan Characters 
Dai Sentai Goggle-V Characters 
Kagaku Sentai Dynaman Characters
Choudenshi Bioman Characters
Dengeki Sentai Changemank Characters 
Choushinsei Flashman Characters 
Hikari Sentai Maskman Character 
Choujuu Sentai Liveman Characters 
Kousoku Sentai Turboranger Character 
Chikyu Sentai Fiveman Characters 
Chōjin Sentai Jetman Characters 
List of Kyōryū Sentai Zyuranger characters 
Gosei Sentai Dairanger Characters 
Ninja Sentai Kakuranger Characters
Chouriki Sentai Ohranger Characters
Gekisou Sentai Carranger Characters
Denji Sentai Megaranger Characters 
Seijuu Sentai Gingaman Characters
Kyuukyuu Sentai GoGoFive Characters 
Mirai Sentai Timeranger Characters 
Hyakujuu Sentai Gaoranger Characters 
Ninpuu Sentai Hurricaneger
Bakuryū Sentai Abaranger Characters
List of Tokusou Sentai Dekaranger characters 
List of Mahou Sentai Magiranger characters 
GoGo Sentai Boukenger Characters 
List of Juken Sentai Gekiranger characters 
List of Engine Sentai Go-onger characters
List of Samurai Sentai Shinkenger characters 
List of Tensou Sentai Goseiger characters 
List of Kaizoku Sentai Gokaiger characters
List of returning characters in Kaizoku Sentai Gokaiger 
List of Tokumei Sentai Go-Busters characters 
List of Zyuden Sentai Kyoryuger characters 
List of Ressha Sentai ToQger characters 
List of Shuriken Sentai Ninninger characters 
List of Doubutsu Sentai Zyuohger characters
 The Thin Blue Line Characters
 List of This Is Us characters
 List of Torchwood characters
 List of characters in The West Wing

Back to top

Lists of animated series characters

 List of Animaniacs characters
 List of Avatar: The Last Airbender characters
 List of characters in The Batman
 List of Beast Wars characters
 List of Ben 10 characters
 List of characters in Camp Lazlo
 List of The Critic characters
 List of Daria characters
 List of Digimon Fusion characters
 List of Digimon Adventure characters
 List of Digimon Tamers characters
 List of characters in Family Guy
 List of recurring Futurama characters
 List of James Bond Jr. characters
 List of The Jetsons characters
 List of Jimmy Neutron characters
 List of Kim Possible characters
 List of recurring The Simpsons characters
 List of ThunderCats characters
 List of SpongeBob SquarePants characters

Back to top

Lists of soap opera characters

 List of Aurora (telenovela) characters
 List of Brookside characters
 List of Coronation Street characters
 List of original Coronation Street characters
 List of former Coronation Street characters
 List of Dark Shadows characters
 List of EastEnders characters
 List of former EastEnders characters
 List of Emmerdale characters
 List of former Emmerdale characters
 List of Family Affairs characters
 List of General Hospital characters
 List of Neighbours characters
 List of former Neighbours characters

Back to top

See also

 List of comics creators appearing in comics
 Lists of LGBT figures in fiction and myth
 List of comic book sidekicks
 List of fictional Scots
 List of fictional demons
 List of fictional vampires
 List of fictional werewolves
 List of fictional characters named "The One"
 List of imaginary characters in fiction
 Lists of horror film characters

Back to top